Vigurs is a surname. Notable people with the surname include:

Charles Vigurs (1888–1917), British gymnast
Iain Vigurs (born 1988), Scottish footballer
John Vigurs (1930–1994), British rower